Absolute Torch and Twang is the third album by k.d. lang and the Reclines, released in 1989.

Critical reception

Fred Dellar of Hi-Fi News & Record Review gave the best rating to the album and said that "Canuck has fashioned yet another album that crosses borderlines and blends various aspects of country music with the sounds stemming from a late night, 40's jukebox".

Track listing

Personnel
Musicians
 k.d. lang – acoustic guitar, guitar, vocals
 Graham Boyle – percussion, tambourine, claves, spoons
 Michael Creber – piano
 John Dymond – bass
 The Five Blind Boys of Alabama – background vocals, voices
 Greg Leisz – steel guitar, slide guitar
 Gordie Matthews – acoustic guitar, guitar, electric guitar
 Ben Mink – organ, acoustic guitar, guitar, mandolin, strings, violin, electric guitar, mandola, bowed bass
 David Piltch – fretless bass, bowed bass
 Michel Pouliot – drums
 Ed Thigpen – drums

Production
Producers: k.d. lang, Ben Mink, Greg Penny

Chart performance

Weekly charts

Year-end charts

Certifications

Awards
Grammy Awards

References

Citations

Print sources
 

K.d. lang albums
1989 albums
Sire Records albums
Canadian Country Music Association Album of the Year albums